Gonzalo González may refer to:

 Gonzalo González (footballer, born 1993), Uruguayan footballer
 Gonzalo González (footballer, born 1995), Argentine footballer